Fernando de Ocampo, O.F.M. (died 1632) was a Roman Catholic prelate who served as the second Bishop of Santa Cruz de la Sierra (1621–1632) and Titular Bishop of Usula (1620–1621).

Biography
Fernando de Ocampo was ordained a priest in the Order of Friars Minor. On December 14, 1620, he was selected by the King of Spain and confirmed by Pope Paul V as Coadjutor Bishop of Santa Cruz de la Sierra and Titular Bishop of Usula. In 1621, he was consecrated bishop by Bartolomé Lobo Guerrero, Archbishop of Lima and succeeded to the bishopric. He served as Bishop of Santa Cruz de la Sierra until his death in 1632.

While bishop, he was the principal consecrator of Luis Jerónimo Oré, Bishop of Concepción.

References

External links and additional sources
 (for Chronology of Bishops) 
 (for Chronology of Bishops) 

1632 deaths
Bishops appointed by Pope Paul V
Franciscan bishops
Roman Catholic bishops of Santa Cruz de la Sierra